Mordellistena balearica is a species of beetle in the genus Mordellistena of the family Mordellidae. It was described in 1985 by Compte and is endemic to Balearic Islands.

References

balearica
Beetles described in 1985
Endemic fauna of the Balearic Islands